Mission Lakes is a pair of lakes in Crow Wing County, in the U.S. state of Minnesota.

The twin lakes consist of Upper Mission Lake and Lower Mission Lake. The Mission Lakes were named for a nearby Ojibwe mission.

See also
List of lakes in Minnesota

References

 

Lakes of Minnesota
Lakes of Crow Wing County, Minnesota